Henri Dedecker (died 6 January 1935) was a Belgian footballer. He played in two matches for the Belgium national football team in 1905.

References

External links
 

Year of birth missing
1935 deaths
Belgian footballers
Belgium international footballers
Place of birth missing
Date of birth missing
Association football midfielders